Ibrahim Yalatif Diabate (born 17 November 1999) is an Ivorian footballer who plays as a forward for Spanish club RCD Mallorca B.

Club career
Born in Bouaké, Diabate was promoted to ASEC Mimosas' first team in September 2017, after a loan period at Ligue 2 side Ivoire Académie. In August 2018, after 11 appearances in all competitions, he signed for RCD Mallorca and was initially assigned to the reserves in Tercera División.

On 2 September 2019, after scoring 16 goals as his side missed out promotion in the play-offs, Diabate was loaned to Sevilla Atlético for one year, with a buyout clause. Upon returning in July 2020, he was assigned back at Mallorca B.

Diabate made his first team debut for the Bermellones on 6 January 2021, coming on as a second-half substitute for Álex Alegría in a 2–2 away draw against CF Fuenlabrada, as his side was knocked out on penalties, for the season's Copa del Rey. His Segunda División debut occurred four days later, as he replaced Dani Rodríguez in a 0–1 home loss against UD Las Palmas.

On 1 February 2021, Diabate moved to Atlético Madrid B in the third division on loan for the remainder of the campaign.

References

External links

1999 births
Living people
People from Bouaké
Ivorian footballers
Association football forwards
ASEC Mimosas players
Segunda División players
Segunda División B players
Tercera División players
Tercera Federación players
RCD Mallorca B players
Sevilla Atlético players
RCD Mallorca players
Atlético Madrid B players
Ivorian expatriate footballers
Ivorian expatriate sportspeople in Spain
Expatriate footballers in Spain